Mangelia subcostellata is an extinct species of sea snail, a marine gastropod mollusk in the family Mangeliidae.

Description
The length of the shell attains 19 mm.

Distribution
This extinct marine species was found in Miocene strata of Aquitaine, France.

References

External links
 Fossilshells.nl: Mangeliinae

subcostellata
Gastropods described in 1865